

Josephine MacDonald
Josephine MacDonald, also known as Josie Mac, is a police officer of GCPD, first appearing in Detective Comics #763 (December 2001), created by Judd Winick and Cliff Chiang.

Josie Mac had a promising career ahead of her, until she responded to a call and discovered the mayor's wife in bed with an exotic dancer. Four days after the incident, her mistake of embarrassing the mayor's wife got her moved to the Missing Persons department at the precinct. Josie made the best out of her transfer because unknown to her colleagues, she possessed minor psychic powers, which allowed her to find things and people which are lost through picking up "messages" from inanimate objects.

Josie's first case in Missing Persons got her partnered up with Oscar Castro. The grandson of mob boss Anthony Antonelli was declared missing. The attackers of his grandson had shot at policemen who had responded to the struggle before the boy was kidnapped. Josie went to her apartment to review the case and discovered Batman was waiting for her. Batman tells her that he is aware of her abilities and warns her to stay away from this case. Josie ignored his warning and it got her father killed. Batman offered his condolences and agrees to help Josie to find Antonelli's grandson while in the same time bringing her father's murderer to justice. She and Batman learn that Two-Face was responsible for the kidnapping because he hated Antonelli for double crossing him on a deal that went bad months ago. They apprehend Two-Face while rescuing Antonelli's grandson. During interrogation, Two-Face professed that he had nothing to do with the murder of Josie's father; Batman believed him but Josie didn't. Josie later discovered that Antonelli's family lawyer David Montassano engineered events to gain control over the Antonelli mob. Montassano was responsible for the deal going bad between Two-Face and Antonelli and also for murder of Josie's father. He figured the death of her father would intimidate and deter her from pursuing the Antonelli case any further. After his arrest, Josie's partner Oscar Castro retired soon after Commissioner Michael Atkins transferred Josie to the Major Crimes Unit. After filling in for Renee Montoya for a time, Josie was partnered with Marcus Driver on the second shift.

Josie Mac appears in Gotham, portrayed by Paulina Singer. Appearing in "Rise of the Villains: Strike Force", she is recruited by Captain Nathaniel Barnes, along with other cadets Luke Garrett, Sal Martinez and Carl Pinkney to create an elite unit "Strike Force". Josie is involved in the case of attacking the candidates for mayor's seat in Gotham after Aubrey James went missing. When the hitman Victor Zsasz (sent by Cobblepot) tries to kill the candidate Randall Hobbs, the Strike Force manages to rescue him. Victor shoots Josie, but she survives due to her bulletproof vest. She later participates in the case of arsons committed by Pike family, in "Scarification" and "By Fire". One of her colleagues, Luke Garrett, is killed by Bridgit Pike. After this case, she is the only surviving member of Strike Force since all other members of the unit were killed in other cases. Although she doesn't appear further in the show, it is possible that she still serves in Strike Force within GCPD.

Lorena Marquez 
Lorena Marquez  was introduced in Aquaman (vol. 6) #16 (May 2004), created by Will Pfeifer and Patrick Gleason.

Fictional character history 
Lorena Marquez is on a date at the San Diego Zoo when an earthquake shakes San Diego and causes it to sink deep into the sea, killing thousands—including Lorena's entire family. She comes into contact with Aquaman, who nurses her back to health as she discovers that she has developed the ability to breathe underwater like an Atlantean. The two manage to locate the other survivors of the quake, as well as Anton Geist, the scientist responsible for the catastrophe. Lorena and Aquaman have no choice but to begin rebuilding the city as "Sub Diego". When Ocean Master switches lives with Aquaman, Lorena assumes the identity of Aquagirl, adopting an aquatic costume. After Aquaman exposes Ocean Master's scheme, Lorena keeps her Aquagirl costume and identity, and the two carry on protecting Sub Diego. When a string of homicides begin to emerge in Sub Diego, Lorena was one of the first to discover that it was former police officer Chandra Abbot who was guilty. The two fight and Chandra admits she did not understand why Aquaman would allow Lorena to help him but she at that moment she understood, she is a good detective.

One Year Later 
In Teen Titans (vol. 3) #34 (May 2006), Lorena is shown at Titans Tower arguing with Holly Granger during a flashback. Lorena is also a member of the Teen Titans during the events of 52. She assists Steel in launching an attack on LexCorp when Natasha Irons is captured by Lex Luthor. She later resurfaces as supporting character of the new Aquaman, Arthur Joseph Curry, in Aquaman: Sword of Atlantis. Apparently, as one of the last Sub Diegoans able to breathe water, she is left in the seas, mourning Koryak's death in the rubble of Poseidonis. She then joins Curry, Cal Durham, Tempest, and the new Topo in their voyage to Sub Diego. Aquagirl appears up in Terror Titans #1 and is kidnapped (along with a group of other teen superheroes) by the Terror Titans. While her teammate Molecule is slain by the new Persuader, Lorena is taken alive, to be mindwiped and forced to fight in the Dark Side Club at the behest of the Apokoliptan Gods on Earth. She is defeated twice, once by Rose Wilson after being stabbed, and again by a brainwashed Terra, who crushes Lorena with a pair of boulders. Aquagirl and the others are eventually freed by Miss Martian, and Lorena joins the survivors in a trek to Titans Tower to recover.

Rejoining the Titans 
While resting in the tower, Lorena meets and befriends Static, telling him that she enjoyed her past experience as a member of the Teen Titans. After realizing that she has nowhere to go and no family, Lorena accepts Wonder Girl's offer to rejoin the team, taking up permanent residence in Titans Tower.

Remaining close friends with Static, Lorena also begins flirting in Spanish with her teammate Blue Beetle, despite him already dating teen superheroine and Titan reserve member, Traci 13. She also quickly gains an enemy in Bombshell, finding her to be rude. Despite her apparent concern for both Static and Blue Beetle, Aquagirl begins flirting with Superboy after she witnesses a fight between him and Wonder Girl.

During a mission to rescue Raven from an extradimensional being called Wyld, Aquagirl and Bombshell are swallowed by massive sea monster mutated from Wyld's energy. After Static destroys Wyld, Aquagirl and Bombshell are left missing at sea with their fates uncertain. In the following issue, it is mentioned that both Bombshell and Aquagirl had been rescued by their teammates, but were sidelined from the Titans due to Wonder Girl no longer wishing to endanger "inexperienced" teen heroes by allowing them membership.

Brightest Day 
In the Brightest Day crossover, Lorena is approached by Mera who had come searching for help against her sister and her Death Squad. She and Mera subsequently reappear when Siren and her army attack Miami, Florida as the opening salvo of an invasion. During the battle, Lorena rescues the new Aqualad by kicking Black Manta in the face just as he is about to stab the youth to death. After Mera and Aqualad successfully trap the invaders inside the Bermuda Triangle, Lorena tells Aqualad not to "get any ideas" as the two teens watch Aquaman and Mera passionately kiss.

She is one of the former Titans that came to aid them in the battle between Superboy-Prime.

Magpie

Mammoth

Bruno Mannheim

Moxie Mannheim
Moxie "Boss" Mannheim is a character appearing in American comic books published by DC Comics, and the father of Bruno Mannheim. In the Pre-Crisis, Moxie Mannheim founded Intergang in the 1920s where he was then killed by rivals.

In the Post-Crisis, Moxie had been in prison since the 1940s after being captured by the Newsboy Legion and was later released from prison. He went to one of his operations to realign himself with Granny Goodness and Virman Vundabar. Discovering that the Newsboys were, seemingly, the same age as when he first fought them, Moxie determined to find out how such a thing could be. He worked with Granny Goodness, Virman Vundabar, and the Female Furies into capturing the Newsboy Legion. During the fight against Guardian, Moxie Mannheim fell into a chasm. Badly injured, Moxie is found by Project Cadmus geneticist Dabney Donovan. Allying with Dabney Donovan, Moxie arranged for himself and his former gang members from the 1940s to be cloned into youthful bodies with superpowers. This led to his henchmen Ginny "Torcher" McGee, Mike "Machine" Gun, Noose, and Rough House being cloned and receiving superpowers. Using Vincent Edge to arrange a meeting between Metropolis' gang-leaders, he killed them all with a bomb in his original body, had Noose kill Vincent once he served his purpose, and declared himself the new head of Intergang. The new Intergang spent much of their time tracking down Jimmy Olsen, whom Moxie believed knew Superman's secret identity.

After Morgan Edge's short-lived reclaiming of his control on Intergang, Lex Luthor took over Intergang and allowed Moxie to be his figurehead.

Moxie had a history with Frank Sixty where one encounter left Frank hospitalized for six months. He later approached the now-cyborg Frank to make him a weapon to destroy Superman. This resulted in a giant lobster robot where its emergence had totaled Frank's lab. Moxie and his remaining lieutenants were captured by Superman. Frank emerged from the rubble and declared himself the new leader of Intergang.

During the Infinite Crisis storyline, Moxie popped up as a member of Alexander Luthor Jr.'s Secret Society of Super Villains. There was some suggestion that Boss Moxie was slain. The suggestion comes from a sequence during the Battle of Metropolis which Superboy-Prime snaps a villain's neck, killing him. In an interview DC editor-in-chief Dan DiDio confirmed that Boss Moxie did indeed die in Infinite Crisis #7 by stating that Superboy-Prime snapped his neck.

Moxie Mannheim in other media
Moxie Mannheim appears in Catwoman: Hunted, voiced by Jonathan Frakes. This version is a member of Leviathan where he represents Intergang.

March Harriet
March Harriet (also called March Hare) is a character appearing in American comic books published by DC Comics.

Harriet Pratt is a small-time con artist and part-time escort who operated outside of Gotham City. She was recruited by Tweedledum and Tweedledee to join the Wonderland Gang which included a brainwashed Mad Hatter. Harriet acted as their version of the March Hare.

In 2016, DC Comics implemented another relaunch of its books called "DC Rebirth", which restored its continuity to a form much as it was prior to "The New 52". In this continuity, Harriet Pratt was born in East London and fell in love with Lily Shaw. When they moved to Gotham City, they stole valuable items and got jobs as escorts at a club owned by a businessman named William Warren. When they came across a small man who was being chased by Warren's security guards, the man escaped and both girls were accidentally shot where the security guards left them for dead. Harriet was nursed back to health by the small man who turned out to be Jervis Tetch. He stated to Harriet that Warren stole devices from him. This caused Harriet to share a mutual revenge on Warren upon Harriet learning that Jervis is Mad Hatter. A few days later, Harriet took up the mantle of March Harriet and joined his Wonderland Gang where they attacked Warren's complex. As Warren was away on a business trip, March Harriet.

March Harriet in other media
March Harriet appears in The Lego Batman Movie. She is among the Batman villains recruited by the Joker to take part in his attacks on Gotham City.

Matches Malone

Matches Malone was originally a Gotham gang boss whom Batman attempted to recruit to help take down Ra's al Ghul. He was accidentally killed by a ricocheting bullet that was meant for Batman, who began to impersonate the man to use his underworld contacts and to fool Ra's.

Post-Crisis, he was a relatively small-time arsonist with his brother Carver and who came to Gotham City early on in Batman's career, attracting Batman's attention when Carver was apparently murdered. Although Matches was the prime suspect, there was no concrete evidence to make the charges stick and Matches was released, only for Batman to subsequently find what appeared to be Matches's dead body in another fire, apparently a suicide. Batman never reported his death; at the time, he had been attempting to establish a criminal alias for himself to help gather information, but the exclusive nature of the criminal sects meant that no one would recruit someone that they had not heard of, prompting Batman to adopt Malone's identity as his own as nobody else knew of the death.

Years later, Batman learned the truth about what had happened. Carver's death had actually been a suicide prompted by his guilt over a fire that he and Matches had started that resulted in the death of a homeless man who had been resting in the building they had torched. Matches made the body look like a murder victim because he was ashamed of his brother's suicide, but did such a good job of it that he ended up basically framing himself for his brother's murder. Deciding to escape Batman stalking him for the crime, Matches used the body of their earlier victim to fake his own death; Batman was so eager to establish a criminal alias that he never took the time to definitively confirm the body's identity. 

After operating underground for years by committing low-end robberies, Matches returned to Gotham after hearing reports of 'his' activities, only to be shot by Scarface for 'his' recent betrayal, surviving long enough to simply confess his role in events to Batman and Nightwing before dying. His last request was that Batman bury him next to his brother and avenge his death. Batman subsequently destroyed Scarface in 'revenge' for Matches. Talking with Nightwing, Batman observed that he would continue using Malone's identity as he had come to recognize that Matches was not an evil man, but had done some bad things that he never had the chance to make up for, the Dark Knight regarding his use of Malone's name as a chance to give Matches some absolution.

The "Matches Malone" identity indirectly caused the events of Batman: War Games, when Stephanie Brown, after being fired as Robin, attempted to implement an old plan of Batman's that would allow the latter to take control of the city's criminal organizations, hoping that this would impress Batman enough to convince to take Stephanie back. Stephanie was unaware that the "agent" who was meant to take control of the meeting was actually Batman himself acting as Malone, resulting in tensions between the crime families flaring up and most of them being killed in the subsequent stand-off, leading into the subsequent gang wars and Stephanie's own apparent death.

In The Batman Adventures comic book series, Batman uses the Matches Malone guise against the False Face Society and a backstory reveals Malone was a low-level enforcer for Rupert Thorne who agreed to become a snitch for Batman and Commissioner Gordon against Thorne. But when Malone began skimming cash from Thorne, he was shot to death by "two Chicago triggers" who go by the monikers Dapper (for always dressing well) and Cricket (for a short wiry build). Upon finding the dying Malone and being told that his killers went to a well-known Chinese restaurant, Batman removed his glasses—and was shocked by what Malone looked like. Batman took the man's guise, defeated the two hitmen and sent them to prison, and has used the guise ever since.

In the Batman Beyond Rebirth series, Terry McGinnis uses the alias of "Trey Malone", son of Matches Malone, to infiltrate Terminal's Jokerz, but Terminal saw through Terry's disguise, due to recognizing him from high school.

Matches Malone in other media
 The character is named Jimmy Malone in the aborted Tom Mankiewicz script The Batman and is a simple criminal accomplice to the Joker.
 Matches Malone appeared in Batman: The Animated Series and The New Batman Adventures as the alias used by Batman (voiced by Kevin Conroy) to infiltrate Two-Face's gang in the two-part episode "Shadow of the Bat" and to investigate the Scarecrow in the episode "Never Fear". 
 Matches Malone appears in Batman: The Brave and the Bold as an alias by Batman (voiced by Diedrich Bader). In the opening of "The Super-Batman of Planet X!", Batman used the alias to help Will Magnus and the Metal Men go undercover against Kanjar Ro's bounty of Space Pirates. In the episode "Chill of the Night!", Batman uses the name variation Matthew Malone during a trip to the past with the Phantom Stranger to see Thomas Wayne and Martha Wayne. In "The Mask of Matches Malone!", Batman gets amnesia while in his Matches Malone persona and believes himself to actually be a gangster.
 Matches Malone appears in Gotham, portrayed by Danny Schoch in his first masked appearance and by Michael Bowen in the second appearance. This version is a philosophical hitman-for-hire who is one of Gotham City's deadliest murderers and was an old partner of Mutants leader Terence "Cupcake" Shaw. He is the masked man in shiny shoes who killed Thomas Wayne and Martha Wayne in front of Bruce Wayne and Selina Kyle (who was watching from the highest part of the fire escape), taking Joe Chill's place in the comics and most adaptations. He got his nickname after lighting a man on fire. This has led Detective James Gordon into finding him to bring to justice. Silver St. Cloud revealed the killer's identity to be Patrick. When Bruce finally confronts Patrick, Patrick stated that he was tired of doing bad things, while barely recalling if he killed Bruce's parents and Bruce decides not to kill Patrick. Using the gun that Bruce left behind, Patrick committed suicide by the time Gordon caught up with Bruce. Gordon and Harvey Bullock were left wondering who could have hired Malone to kill Thomas and Martha (which was eventually revealed to be Hugo Strange on behalf of the Court of Owls).
 The Matthew Malone variation appears in Young Justice as Batman's disguise in the episode "Elder Wisdom", where Beast Boy, Static, and Blue Beetle respond to a request for help, where "Matthew" tells them that his daughter Moira was captured by robot monkeys. This version of Matthew has a distinct Irish accent and owns Match Electronics Store. Beast Boy, Blue Beetle and Static then rescue Matthew's "daughter", Moira, who is actually a disguised Miss Martian, from Professor Ivo and his army of MONQIs. This turns out to be an elaborate setup by Batman, Miss Martian, Oracle and Robin to help with the Outsiders' approval ratings and make their enemies, the Light, look bad in the public spotlight.

Menace
Menace is a character appearing in American comic books published by DC Comics. Real name Russell Tavaroff, he is a former friend of Luke Fox who became his enemy upon getting exposed to the Venom offshoot Snakebite which gives him enhanced strength and durability at the cost of giving him a mental illness.

Menace in other media
Menace appears in Batwoman, portrayed by Jesse Hutch. This version is a Crows agent who Jacob Kane assigned to take over Sophie Moore's case. While examining the scene of the fight with Black mask, Russell found some of Batwoman's spilled blood. He tries to find a match in the system only for Sophie to remove Ryan's info from their system. After using lethal force on the Snakebite users and the shooting of Luke Fox, Russell and his followers doctor the footage claiming that Luke had a gun. Upon finding out after a talk with Sophie Moore, Jacob advises that Russell go on suspension pending an investigation only to be knocked out by Russell. Then he and his followers try to have an unconscious Jacob undergo another Snakebite injection only to be defeated by Batwoman. Jacob later exposes the truth on what happened Luke Fox while also mentioning the arrests of Russell and those involved. Russell was later released on bail while awaiting trial. Luke later encountered Russell in a bar and got involved in a poker game that John Diggle was involved in and beats Russell in the game. When Russell attacks Luke outside the bar, he is fended off by Diggle. Russell is among the former Crows operatives that side with Black Mask. When Russell states that he would just be a "cog" in someone's device, Black Mask offers to make him a "machine" instead. Using Bane's Venom and the Snakebite drug, Black Mask experimented on Russell which didn't work at first causing Black Mask to have his body disposed. He regained conscious in Mary's clinic and pursued her for the Snakebite that was taken off him before being defeated by Batwing.

Menagerie
Menagerie is a name shared by two antiheroines in the DC Universe, both members of the Elite. The two are Puerto Rican sisters who are linked with a symbiotic alien weapon crèche called symbeasts.

Pamela first appears in Action Comics #775 (March 2001). While the origins of her powers are unclear in Action Comics #775, Manchester Black states that the rogue Men in Black (from the Department of Extranormal Operations) once picked up the dregs of society, turning them into weapons and selling them off to the highest alien bidder. Black recruits Pam to be a member of the Elite. This group takes it upon themselves to "free the Earth of scum". They come into conflict with Superman during their first mission and Superman disables them following a showdown on Jupiter's moon, Io. The Elite are delivered into custody, but soon released by President Lex Luthor. During an assassination attempt on Luthor, Menagerie reveals to Superman that the Elite are acting against their wills. For her betrayal, Black induces a stroke in her, putting her in a permanent vegetative state.

Sonja first appears in JLA #100 (August 2004). Upon Black's apparent death, his sister, Vera Black, takes it upon herself to clear the family name and reassembles the Elite as a force for good. As Sister Superior she convinces Pamela's sister, Sonja, to assume control of the alien cache as the second Menagerie. Vera then approaches the JLA with a proposition to form a sort of black ops JLA team: Justice League Elite. Sonja's hatred of Manchester Black becomes a hatred of the Elite. Sonja sees this as her opportunity to kill Vera's dream, so she plays along and joins the team. In their first mission, Menagerie secretly coaxes Coldcast into killing the foreign terrorist dictator, Hi-Shan Bhat. Menagerie lays low during the fallout and puts effort into her personal relationship with Coldcast. The two become lovers and are drawn together by their shared affection for Pamela. Then, while most of the Elite goes underground, Vera is finally fully overtaken by the disembodied Manchester Black.

While Black threatens Earth with a Fourth World god, Menagerie goes missing and Coldcast is arrested by the JLA for Bhat's murder. Coldcast confesses to the murder and is taken to the Slab prison. There he is visited by the spirit of the recently departed Manitou Raven, who frees him from Menagerie's control. Coldcast is exonerated and the team tracks Sonja to Costa Rica, where she affirms that she acted against Vera to punish her for Manchester's role in the death of Menagerie's sister. She is taken into JLA custody, deprived of the aliens, and begins a gradual separation that they hope will sever her connection to the symbeasts; Green Arrow observes that the process is basically heroin withdrawal multiplied by a billion plus one, and at first the beasts and the host can only be kept apart from each other by a transparent wall.

Menagerie in other media
Menagerie appears in Superman vs. The Elite, voiced by Melissa Disney.

A variation of the Pamela version of Menagerie appears in a self-titled Supergirl episode, portrayed by Jessica Meraz. In this show, Pamela Ferrer is a jewel thief who got bonded to a snake-like alien, transforming her into Menagerie. After she killed her partner Chuck and some other people, Menagerie was confronted by Supergirl, the Martian Manhunter, Brainiac 5, and Alex Danvers. Their fight attracted the attention of the Children of Liberty. When Menagerie planned to rob the masquerade ball, she encountered Nia Nal and Supergirl and George Lockwood show up. While she did manage to subdue Supergirl, the snake-like alien on Menagerie was killed by George. President Baker made an example out of Menagerie and had her incarcerated. While in her cell, Menagerie received a pleasing letter from Manchester Black. In the episode "What's So Funny About Truth, Justice & the American Way?", Menagerie escapes from prison and forms the Elite alongside Manchester Black, the Hat, and an unnamed Morae. They appear in various locations before they get in military base in Wyoming, where they attempt to reprogram the satellite weapon (used to destroy alien ships) to turn into the White House, but Supergirl and her friends prevent this. In "Stand and Deliver", Supergirl and Nia Mal manage to arrest and take her to DEO.

Mentalla

Mentalla (Delya Castil) was a rejected Legion candidate who infiltrated the Fatal Five, but was found out and subsequently murdered by the Emerald Empress.

Micron

Micron is a superhero and the successor to The Atom. He made his first appearance in the Batman Beyond episode "The Call, Part 1" (November 2000), where he was voiced by Wayne Brady as a member of Justice League Unlimited. In his debut "The Call", after a rather intense but successful training session, Micron got a distress call from an unknown source about a monorail gone haywire. After saving the only person on board ― its driver ― he tried to prevent the monorail from colliding with another coming in the opposite direction. Micron disengaged the train from its track, and then derailed it. Right when he tried to get out of the plummeting train, the door suddenly closed and a force-field barricaded Micron inside. The train crashed into a building, leaving Micron badly injured. Little did he know that the person responsible for the wreck was Superman, who was under the control of Starro. Micron was placed in a stasis field, where he slowly recovered. Sometime later, Starro/Superman tried to sabotage the field and finish Micron off. However, this attempt was promptly interrupted by the other Leaguers. A battle ensued, and Micron mustered enough strength to get out of the tank, and snatched Superman with his magnified hand. However, he was still feeble, so Superman easily knocked him unconscious. Micron was then returned to the stasis field, where he most likely recovered in short time.

Alternate versions of Micron
A Future's End Micron appears in Batman Beyond. Brother Eye implanted a device on Micron that made him see false images, making it seem as though Brother Eye had killed all of his fellow JLA members. Micron spread the word that the Justice League was dead, and Batman had disappeared. When the invasion of Neo Gotham had begun, Micron found Tim Drake and questioned him. He remarked that he didn't sound like Terry, causing Tim to reveal that Terry was dead and he had replaced him. Tim had carried a Brother Eye AI back with him to Neo Gotham, allowing its location to be revealed. Micron helped to defend the city from Brother Eye's cyborg army.

Micron helped to defend the Court of Owls base where Barbara Gordon and Tim were working on activating a JLA transporter. When Tim came back to Neo Gotham, he helped to defeat the Wonder Woman and Superman cyborgs. He shrunk down and got inside of the cyborgs, and then grew, exploding the cyborgs.

Midas
Midas is a character in DC Comics and an enemy of Green Arrow.

Midas (whose real name is unknown) is a scientist working on a bacterial strain that would be able to revolutionize the treatment of toxic waste. While demonstrating his findings, he encounters a woman who seduces him, but turns out to be an eco-terrorist hoping to steal the formula. The terrorists botch the job, causing the explosion which kills them, but sends Midas screaming in flames. Burned alive, he leaps into a river of toxic waste, and emerged as a monster entirely composed of it. Skilled in mechanical engineering as well as toxic waste studies, Midas constructs the Blood Rose robot, who becomes the love of his life, aiding him in a life of crime that especially worked against Oliver Queen.

A different version of Midas, renamed James Midas (portrayed by Andrew Kavadas), appears in Arrow season seven episode "Training Day". This version is a corrupt businessman and CEO of Midas Medical. In the episode, he begins selling bullets containing chlormethine to the gangs. Oliver finds and arrests him, but due to procedural mistake, Mayor Pollard releases him from charges. He attempts to rid of all of chlormethine, but was ambushed by deputized Team Arrow and the members of the police force, being arrested properly.

Mime
Mime is a character appearing in American comic books published by DC Comics.

Camilla Orton was the daughter of a firework salesman named Oscar Ortin who had a disdain for loud noises. After the death of her parents, Camilla began practicing in the art of the mime artist. She started the Cameo Company until it went bankrupt driving her to a life of crime. She stole several bells from the churches across Gotham City before being apprehended by Batman and remanded to Arkham Asylum.

Mime in other media
Mime appears in The Lego Batman Movie. She is among the Batman villains recruited by Joker to take part in his attacks on Gotham City.

Minister Blizzard

Mirror Master

Mister Bones

Mister Miracle

Mister Mxyzptlk

Molecule

Molecule is a superhero in the DC Universe.

The character, created by Geoff Johns and Carlos Ferreira, first appeared in Teen Titans (vol. 3) #38 (September 2006).

Within the context of the stories, Molecule is a teen superhero patterned after the Atom and a member of the Teen Titans during the "one-year gap" between the series Infinite Crisis and the "One Year Later" storyline. He is one of a group of teen heroes attacked by the Terror Titans and put in the arena of the Dark Side Club. While trying to escape, he is severed in two by the Persuader.

Mongal
Mongal is a supervillain in the DC Universe. She made her first unnamed appearance in Showcase '95 #8 (September 1995); her first appearance as Mongal was in Superman (vol. 2) #170 (July 2001).

Mongal is the sister of Mongul II (who is the son of Mongul I), introduced by her brother to Superman in Superman (vol. 2) #170. When Krypto the Superdog nearly killed Mongul II, Mongal escaped and reappeared to destroy New York City. After Maxima's death in the Our Worlds at War miniseries, Mongal was chosen as the ruler of Maxima's homeworld of Almerac and was established as a galactic threat to Superman.

After a squabble with her brother in Green Lantern (vol. 4) #8 (March 2006), Mongul II killed her with a punch, stating family to be a weakness.

Her desiccated body appears in Green Lantern Corps (vol. 2) #20 as the target to Mongul II's ramblings. Mongul II, newly imbued with a Sinestro Corps ring, taunts her skull by saying he would be the one to carry on their father's legacy and then drops it from the sky.

Mongal possesses superhuman strength and stamina.

Mongal in other media
 Mongal appears in the Batman: The Brave and the Bold episode "Duel of the Double-Crossers!", voiced by Gary Anthony Williams. This version is Mongul's sister and is shown to be very competitive towards him.
 Mongal appears in DC Super Hero Girls:
 Mongal appears in DC Super Hero Girls: Intergalactic Games, voiced by Julianne Grossman. She represents the Korugar Academy as a participant in the eponymous games.
 Mongal appeared in the DC Extended Universe (DCEU) film The Suicide Squad, portrayed by Mayling Ng. She joins the eponymous team on a mission in Corto Maltese. During a skirmish, she takes down a local military helicopter and dies in its fiery wreckage along with her teammate Captain Boomerang.

Mongul

Alex Montez

Juan Montez
Juan Montez is a character in DC Comics.

Juan Montez is a former professional boxer who went by the nickname "Mauler" and is a former sparring partner of Ted Grant. With Maria Montez, he became the father of Yolanda. At the time when Ted Grant was thought to be lost in Limbo forever, Nuklon gave Juan Ted's champion belt to remember him by.

Juan Montez in other media
Juan Montez appears in Stargirl, portrayed by Wilmer Calderon. This version is devoted to the Catholic religion. In flashbacks seen in the episode "Wildcat", he and Maria supported Yolanda during her school presidential campaign against Cindy Burman. When Cindy leaked a risque photo of Yolanda, this strained her relationship with her parents who grounded her until further notice, made her go upstairs to her room after school, discontinued taking her to church, and never came near Blue Valley High School. When Yolanda comes in from outside after her first outing as Wildcat II, he and Maria scold her for being outside her room. When Alex asks why they have to keep yelling at her, Juan tells Alex to be quiet. Yolanda tries to get her parents to forgive her and have the family go back to how they originally were before the incident. After Maria states that they can't go back to it as Yolanda disgraced her family and herself which they believed, Juan orders Yolanda to go to her room.

Maria Montez
Maria Montez is a character in DC Comics.

Maria Montez is the wife of Juan Montez and an old friend of Ted Grant. When Maria and her unnamed sister were pregnant, they were experimented upon by the evil Doctor Love. The side effects of the experiments gave her daughter Yolanda abilities and she supported her campaign as the second Wildcat to the point where she used her sewing skills to patch up her costume if it gets damaged.

After Yolanda was killed by Eclipso, Maria brought her body to a witch who was able to bring Yolanda back to life. However, this was exposed as a scam by the original Wildcat.

Maria Montez in other media
Maria Montez appears in Stargirl, portrayed by Kikey Castillo. This version is devoted to Catholic religion and is a housewife. In flashbacks seen in the episode "Wildcat", she and Juan supported Yolanda during her school presidential campaign against Cindy Burman. When Cindy leaked a risque photo of Yolanda, this strained her relationship with her parents who grounded her until further notice, made her go upstairs to her room after school, discontinued taking her to church, and never came near Blue Valley High School. After Yolanda's first outing as Wildcat II and her parents scolding her for being outside her room, she tries to get her parents to forgive her and have the family go back to how they originally were before the incident. Maria states that they can't go back to it as Yolanda disgraced her family and herself, which they believed, as Juan orders Yolanda to go to her room. This caused Yolanda to take up Stargirl's offer to officially become the second Wildcat. In "Summer School: Chapter Seven," Maria confronts Yolanda at the church for involving Father Thomas in her drama as Father Thomas talks her down. When Courtney later calls up the Montez residence wanting to speak to Yolanda, Maria calls Courtney a corrupting influence and tells her never to call Yolanda again. Maria also called up Richie's Diner where her co-worker Maria Carmen Saravia tells her that Yolanda will still have her job if she is wanting to return.

Sophie Moore
Sophie "Gimme" Moore is a character in DC Comics.

The character first appeared in Detective Comics #859 and was created by Greg Rucka and J.H. Williams III.

Sophie Moore was a cadet captain at West Point, where she held the rank of S-3, or Operations Officer. She was also the roommate and girlfriend of Kate Kane, who was herself the Brigade Executive Officer, one rank above Sophie. The two boxed competitively at the academy, with a strong implication that Kate beat Sophie in an academy championship match before their senior year. When Kate resigned from the academy due to DADT allegations, she did not rat out Sophie.

In 2011, "The New 52" rebooted the DC universe. Sophie's history with Kate remains intact. After graduating from West Point, Sophie eventually made the rank of colonel and accepted a teaching position at Gotham Military Academy. She later reunites with Kate by chance at a charity carnival where she learns that Kate is engaged to Maggie Sawyer, and attempts to schedule a friendly dinner with Kate, to no avail.

Sophie Moore in other media
Sophie Moore appears in Batwoman, portrayed by Meagan Tandy. This version is accused of homosexual conduct for her relationship with Kate, though she still decides to stay in the military. She later became a high-level agent of Crows Security. The episode "Grinning From Ear to Ear" introduced her mother Diane (portrayed by Jeryl Prescott) who likes Batman, but dislikes Batwoman due to the heroine's status as an out lesbian. Sophie was also responsible for apprehending Cluemaster during her earlier years.

Mother Mayhem
Mother Mayhem is the name of three characters appearing in American comic books published by DC Comics.

Anna Resik
Anna Resik is the first known Mother Mayhem who is the mother of the eighth Brother Blood.

May Bennett
May Bennett is the second known Mother Mayhem. The ninth Brother Blood is her child.

New 52
Introduced in The New 52, Sonya Tarinka was a woman without a home and whose only constants were hunger and loneliness. This changed when she was approached by a charismatic man who would introduce himself as Brother Blood. Claiming to be more than man, he explained that everything with blood is connected by the Red that humans will not only be united under primal laws again but that something much bigger is coming to reset us all. Liking the idea of unity, she stayed despite his unorthodox religious flaws and became a loyal pupil.

Doing her own research, she began to realize the beliefs were true. Starting to develop powers, she ran to her friends to share the news but came to find Brother Blood and all but six occultists defeated. Not to be deterred, she manipulated their very bodies to make them super-soldiers to pick up where Brother Blood left off.

Mother Mayhem in other media
 Ana Mercedes portrays Maya Resik, Sebastian Blood's mother, in Arrow. She is not called Mother Mayhem and has no powers.

 The May Bennett version of Mother Mayhem appears in Titans, portrayed by Franka Potente. This version is an archaeologist. 

 An unidentified version of Mother Mayhem appears in Teen Titans: The Judas Contract, voiced by Meg Foster.

Mr. Freeze

Multiplex

Multiplex is a supervillain in the DC Universe.

The character, created by Gerry Conway and Al Milgrom, first appeared as Danton Black in Firestorm #1 (March 1978) and as Multiplex in Firestorm #2 (April 1978).

Within the context of the stories, Danton Black is a nuclear physicist who worked as Martin Stein's assistant in the designing of the Hudson Nuclear Facility. Feeling that he is not receiving his due credit, he begins stealing lab equipment. When he is caught by Stein and fired, he publicly accuses Stein of stealing his designs for the power plant. He breaks into the plant to steal blueprints to fabricate evidence on the same night that Stein attempts to bring it on line. Caught in the same explosion that fuses Stein and Ronnie Raymond into Firestorm, he gains the ability to split himself into identical duplicates, though those duplicates are smaller than the original, and get smaller the more he splits.

Multiplex was a member of the Suicide Squad team tasked with capturing Firestorm when the hero attempted to coerce the nations of the Earth to destroy their nuclear weapons. Multiplex ran afoul of the Parasite, a dangerous villain brought along as a last resort, and appeared to be completely eaten by him.

Multiplex returned years later as an unwilling servant of the Thinker. He claimed to be the same villain that Firestorm had faced before, though he had no explanation as to how he was still alive. His powers had changed, as his duplicates were not reduced in size and appeared to be disposable.

In The New 52 reboot, during the Forever Evil storyline, Multiplex appears as a member of the Secret Society of Super Villains. The Crime Syndicate sent Multiplex with Black Bison, the Hyena, Plastique and Typhoon to finish Gorilla Grodd's job. The villains ended up defeated by the Rogues, since one of their targets was the hospital that Captain Cold's sister was recuperating at.

In the 2020 crossover event, Endless Winter, Multiplex appeared as one of several supervillains working for Black Adam to help fight the Frost King. Although not confirmed, it is implied that he dies at the hands of the Frost King.

Multiplex in other media
Danton Black / Multiplex appears in The Flash episode "Fastest Man Alive", portrayed by Michael Christopher Smith. This version is a former Stagg Industries employee who attempted to get revenge on his former employer Simon Stagg for stealing his research in cloning, which led to the death of Black's wife. As a result of being exposed to dark matter after S.T.A.R. Labs's particle accelerator exploding while experimenting on himself, Black gained the ability to create mindless duplicates of himself that he can control mentally. After realizing his powers causes great strain on him, the Flash exploits this by tricking Black into creating hundreds of duplicates and defeating the weakened original. While trying to tackle the Flash, Black ends up defenestrating himself. The speedster attempts to save him, but Black chooses to fall to his death. Cisco Ramon later posthumously nicknames him Multiplex.

Mutant Leader

Murmur
Murmur is a supervillain in the DC Comics universe. He is one of the new Rogues to threaten the Flash, first appearing in the prestige format one-shot The Flash: Iron Heights (2001).

Dr. Michael Christion Amar, a once respected surgeon, succumbed to madness and started a killing spree to stop the voices inside his head. This spree went through Central and Keystone City and caught the eye of police officers Fred Chyre and Joe Jackam. They later tracked Amar down with the help from Central City forensic scientist, Barry Allen. Part of Amar's psychosis is the inability to stop himself from blurting out his crimes. Because of these outbursts, he is quickly convicted and sentenced to death. 

It is soon discovered that Amar's blood is so abnormal that lethal injection can not kill him. While incarcerated in Iron Heights prison, Amar cuts out his own tongue and sews his mouth shut so he will no longer be able to incriminate himself. Wearing a thin mask of his own design, Amar becomes known as Murmur. While in prison, Murmur creates a virus that kills the guards and prisoners and escapes during the riots it causes. He then joins Blacksmith, who helps him with creating the virus, and her rogues. Afterwards, Murmur strikes out on his own.

Murmur is one of the villains being controlled by the Top during the Rogue War story arc.

In Infinite Crisis #1, Murmur is seen working in Gotham City with the Riddler, the Body Doubles and the Fisherman in a murderous attack on Gotham police officers. He is seen in issue #7 as one member of the Secret Society of Supervillains, participating in an attack on Metropolis. A superhero army stops the Society. Murmur has also teamed up with another Batman villain - Hush - in the Man-Bat miniseries, which takes place before the Infinite Crisis event.

One year after the events of Infinite Crisis, Murmur has made only one full appearance in the DC Universe. In writer Gail Simone's Secret Six, he is one of the villains sent to retrieve the Get-Out-of-Hell-Free card from the team. The only other mention of the villain post-One Year Later is a framed front page newspaper of the Central City Citizen detailing Murmur's arrest and incarceration by police. It is seen on a wall of the Allen household in The Flash: Rebirth #1.

Murmur in other media
 Murmur appears in Arrow, portrayed by Adrian Glynn McMorran. Introduced in the third season, this version was beaten by corrupt police officers and forced to confess to a crime he did not commit, for which he served time in Iron Heights Penitentiary and had his mouth sewn shut. Upon being released, he seeks revenge by stealing diamonds to create diamond-tipped bullets to pierce police officers' body armor, only to be foiled and subdued by Team Arrow. As of the fourth season, Murmur has been re-incarcerated and built up a gang. While threatening Damien Darhk, the former forces Murmur to kill his gang and threatens him into joining H.I.V.E. The latter goes on to contribute to helping Darhk escape prison and kill Black Canary before mounting a failed attempt on Noah Kuttler's life before he is foiled by Oliver Queen and John Diggle.
 A female incarnation of Murmur named Michelle Amar appears in the ninth season of The Flash, portrayed by Alexandria Wailes. This version is a masked member of the Red Death's Rogues who is described as an "angry med student turned serial killer", wields a knife created from Wayne Enterprises technology, and communicates through sign language.

Dexter Myles
Dexter Myles is a character appearing in American comic books published by DC Comics.

Dexter is on duty when the Flash comes to the Flash Museum in search of a weapon called the Summoner. Dexter is happy to show Flash where the Summoner is, but is horrified to discover it is missing. Later when the Flash is battling Vandal Savage, Dexter shows up with the blueprints for the Summoner that the Flash asked for. With these blueprints, the Flash is able to defeat Savage.

Dexter Myles in other media
Dexter Myles appears in The Flash episode "Going Rogue", portrayed by Bruce Harwood.

Mysto
Mysto the Magician Detective is a character in the DC Universe. He first appeared in Detective Comics #203 (January 1954). Mysto was a regular back-up feature in Detective Comics #203–212 (October 1954). He was dropped when Detective Comics went from 44 pages to 36. Mysto's only Modern Age appearance was in Detective Comics #500 (March 1981), in a special anniversary team-up story featuring Slam Bradley, Roy Raymond, and many other detectives that had once appeared in previous issues.

Rick Carter is a Wildcat flier piloting a small single-engine plane over the Tibetan plains when he spots three bandits chasing a lone old man. In gratitude for Carter saving the old man's life, Carter is taught ancient mysticism as well as tricks of the marketplace. Carter and his manservant Sikhi return to the United States to fight crime, using his skills as a stage magician.

Powers and abilities of Mysto
Mysto is a skilled stage illusionist who uses his powers to confuse criminals. He is also an above-average detective.

References

 DC Comics characters: M, List of